Cleveland Electric Company, Inc. is a privately owned specialty contractor located in Atlanta, Georgia, United States that serves Power Generation, Mission Critical, Healthcare and Industrial customers. In 2012, it is the 6th ranked specialty contractor in Southeast United States, serving regional revenues in 2011 of $136.64 million. The company is a member of The Electric Roundtable, an organization of electrical contractors whose goal is "To exchange best practices in every facet of electrical construction, design, maintenance, engineering, and internal operations."

History
Cleveland Electric was founded in Atlanta, Georgia in 1925 by Ras Cleveland and specialized in electric motor repair. Over time, the company expanded into electric apparatus repair, sales and service. Its motor business grew and eventually produced about $30 million in revenue. The original location of the business resided in downtown Atlanta near the Georgia Tech Campus. The location was later sold to the Coca Cola Company and the site now houses their World Headquarters Campus.

After World War II, Cleveland Electric began electrical construction work.  In 1959 Ras Cleveland's two sons, Louie Cleveland, Sr. and James Cleveland, Sr. took over the business. Louie managed repairs and James managed construction.

In 1962 Cleveland Electric started a mechanical construction department and purchased an instrumentation company. The motor repair portion of the business was sold in 1998. Growing construction in the South allowed the company to expand and grow into its current target areas.

, Vann Cleveland is Director; John Cleveland is President.

Headquarters
Cleveland Electric operates from its headquarters complex in NorthWest Atlanta.

Areas served
Cleveland Electric provides contractor services in the following areas:
Electrical (88%)
Mechanical (12%)
Datacom

Projects
Cleveland Electric has performed projects in the following areas for the customers listed (partial list):

Industrial / Power Generation / Water Treatment
Alabama Power
Anheuser Busch
Chattahoochie WTP
F Wayne Hill WTP
Georgia Power
Georgia Tech
TVA
Healthcare
Athens Regional Medical Center
Cartersville Medical Center
CDC
Dekalb Medical Center
Emory University
Georgia Department of Health
Georgia State University
Georgia Tech
Piedmont Fayette Hospital
Mission Critical
AT&T
CNN
Earthlink
Georgia Power
Hewlett-Packard
Publix
Sprint
Suntrust
Transit
CONRAC
MARTA
Institutional / Commercial
Anheuser Busch
Atlanta Falcons
CDC
Coca-Cola
CONRAC
Emory University
ESPN
Federal Reserve Bank
Georgia Tech
High Museum of Art
The Lovett School
Milton High School
Morris Brown College
Southern Polytechnical Institute
Westin Hotel
University of Georgia

Honors and awards
In 2012, Cleveland Electric was ranked 6th among specialty contractors in Southeast United States. The company is regularly ranked in the top 100 contractors in the United States.

References

External links
Company website
Cleveland Electric at Electric Roundtable
Company Overview of Cleveland Electric Company, Inc. at Bloomberg Business Week
Cleveland Electric Company at InsideView
The Top Specialty Contractors at ENR Southeast

Construction and civil engineering companies of the United States
Companies based in Atlanta
Business services companies established in 1925
1925 establishments in Georgia (U.S. state)